Xoşçobanlı (also, Xoşçobanli, Khosh-Chabanly, Khoshchobanly, and Khoshdzhabanly) is a village and municipality in the Imishli Rayon of Azerbaijan.  It has a population of 1,281.

References 

Populated places in Imishli District